Maximum Pro Wrestling (MaxPro) was a Canadian independent professional wrestling organization, founded in 2010 with the merger of Scott D'Amore's Border City Wrestling out of Windsor, Ontario and BSE Pro Wrestling out of Toronto, Ontario.

History
The formation of MaxPro was confirmed on February 3, 2010, when D'Amore announced that he was leaving his position as an Agent with Total Nonstop Action Wrestling to pursue this new project within Ontario.

On March 3, 2010, a partnership was announced between MaxPro and Dragon Gate USA that will bring Dragon Gate USA to Canada for the first time with shows scheduled on May 7 and 8 in Windsor and Toronto respectively.

The company's inaugural tour in March 2010 was labeled as The March Breakdown Tour and was held in the cities of Niagara Falls, Chatham, and Georgetown, Ontario. Rhino headlined all three events for the tour.

The company's second tour in April 2010 was labeled as The Spring Loaded Tour and was held in the cities of Windsor, Markham, and Woodstock, Ontario. Tommy Dreamer wrestled on all 3 events for the tour.

The company's third tour in April 2010 was labeled as The Gold Rush Tour and was held in the cities of Timmins, North Bay, and Brampton, Ontario. Kevin Nash made a rare Canadian independent appearance.

Championships

MaxPro Triple Crown Championship

MaxPro Arctic Championship

MaxPro recognizes all the previous titles of Border City Wrestling, BSE Pro, and Neo Spirit Pro-Wrestling in their records, but retired.

Roster

Regular roster
Josh Alexander
Phil Atlas
Turk Celik
James Champagne
Jayson Cyprus
Tyson Dux
Michael Elgin
Flesh
Brent B
Johnny J
Kobra Kai
Tiberius King
Marcus Marquez
Robbie McAllister
Jake O'Reilly
Player Dos
Player Uno
Pierre Shadows
Sebastian Suave
Tyler Tirva

Female wrestlers
Xandra Bale
Nikita
Courtney Rush
Gabrielle Vanderpool

Staff
Dave Blezzard (Play-By-Play Commentator)
Bob Kapur (Colour Commentator)
Jim Korderas (Senior Referee)
Arda Ocal (Ring Announcer)

Featured stars and alumni
Big Daddy Hammer
Colt Cabana
Dane Jarris
Franky The Mobster
The Hurricane
Jimmy Jacobs
Kevin Nash
Kiyoshi
Manabu Soya
Masayuki Kono
Matt Morgan
Rhino
Robbie E
Shawn Spears
Sonjay Dutt
Tommy Dreamer
Taylor Wilde
Traci Brooks
Val Venis
Yujiro Kushida

References

External links
 Official Maximum Pro Wrestling Facebook Page
 Official Maximum Pro Wrestling Facebook Group
 Official Maximum Pro Wrestling Twitter Page

Canadian professional wrestling promotions
2010 establishments in Ontario
Professional wrestling in Ontario